The 8th Parliament of Lower Canada was in session from January 21, 1815, to February 29, 1816. Elections to the Legislative Assembly in Lower Canada had been held in March 1814. Colonial administrator Gordon Drummond dissolved the assembly in 1816 after it attempted to reintroduce charges against judges Jonathan Sewell and James Monk who had already been cleared of the same charges by the British Privy Council. All sessions were held at Quebec City.

References

External links 
  Assemblée nationale du Québec (French)
Journals of the House of Assembly of Lower Canada ..., John Neilson (1815)

08
1815 establishments in Lower Canada
1816 disestablishments in Lower Canada